The Evan Anthem is an American rock quartet from York County, Pennsylvania.

Their debut album  Prologue was released in 2003, followed by Sens in 2005.

Members
Derek Kern (vocals, guitar, piano, organ)
Brian Miller (bass)
Matt Miller (vocals, keyboards, Moog)
Josh Young (drums, percussion, programming)

References

External links

MySpace

American Christian rock groups
Musical groups from Pennsylvania
Musical groups established in 2003